Rabindranath "Rabin" Bhatta (1924 – 6 July 2004) was an Indian boxer. He competed in the men's flyweight event at the 1948 Summer Olympics.

References

External links
 

1924 births
2004 deaths
Indian male boxers
Olympic boxers of India
Boxers at the 1948 Summer Olympics
Sportspeople from Kolkata
Flyweight boxers